This page shows a partial list of cemeteries in Berlin.

Cemeteries
 Charlottenburg, Friedhof Heerstraße, Burial site of Horst Buchholz, George Grosz, Hilde Hildebrand and Grethe Weiser
 Charlottenburg, 
 Kreuzberg, Holy Trinity Cemetery I Burial site of Fanny Hensel Felix Mendelssohn and Rahel Varnhagen also Holy Trinity Cemetery II Burial site of Carl Blechen, Martin Gropius, Adolph von Menzel and Theodor Mommsen. (See )
 Kreuzberg, Jerusalem und Neue Kirche III Burial site of Adelbert von Chamisso and E.T.A. Hoffmann, also Friedhof IV der Gemeinde Jerusalems- und Neue Kirche Burial site of Rikard Nordraak.
 Kreuzberg, Burial site of Gustav Stresemann
 Lichtenberg, Zentralfriedhof Friedrichsfelde. Burial site of Rosa Luxemburg, Karl Liebknecht
 Mitte, Dorotheenstädtischer Friedhof. Burial site of Georg Wilhelm Friedrich Hegel, Johann Gottlieb Fichte, Bertolt Brecht, Karl Friedrich Schinkel, John Heartfield and Johannes Rau
 Niederschönhausen, Burial site of Ernst Busch, Fritz Cremer, Hans Litten, Anton Saefkow.
 Schöneberg, Städtischer Friedhof III. Burial site of Marlene Dietrich and Helmut Newton.
 Schöneberg, Alter St.-Matthäus-Kirchhof Berlin. Burial site of the Brothers Grimm and Gustav Kirchhoff. (See :de:Alter St.-Matthäus-Kirchhof Berlin)
 Spandau, In den Kisseln. Largest cemetery in Berlin
 Weißensee, Weißensee Cemetery. A large Jewish cemetery which mainly survived Nazism and the DDR.
 Wilmersdorf, Friedhof Schmargendorf. Burial site of Max Pechstein.
 Zehlendorf, Städtischer Friedhof Berlin-Zehlendorf. Burial site of Heinrich George.
 Zehlendorf, St Annen Friedhof, Dahlem Dorf. Burial site of Rudi Dutschke.
 Zehlendorf, Dahlem Cemetery, Burial site of Jacobus Henricus van 't Hoff, the first winner of the Nobel Prize in Chemistry.
 Zehlendorf, Waldfriedhof Dahlem, Hüttenweg. Burial site of Gottfried Benn, La Jana, Karl Hofer, Bernd Rosemeyer and Werner Sombart.
 Zehlendorf, Waldfriedhof Zehlendorf, Potsdamer Chaussee. Burial site of Willy Brandt, Helmut Käutner, Julius Leber, Hildegard Knef, Erich Mühsam, Ernst Reuter and Renée Sintenis.

See also 
:de:Kategorie:Friedhof in Berlin

 
Cemeteries
Berlin